The Dukan Dam (Sorani Kurdish: بەنداوی دووکان Arabic: سد دوكان) is a multi-purpose concrete arch dam in As Sulaymaniyah Governorate, Kurdistan Region of Iraq. It impounds the Little Zab, thereby creating Lake Dukan. The Dukan Dam was built between 1954 and 1959 whereas its power station became fully operational in 1979.

Project history

The Dukan Dam was built between 1954 and 1959 as a multi-purpose dam to provide water storage, irrigation and hydroelectricity. The design for the dam was carried out by the British engineering company Binnie & Partners (with Partner and third generation Binnie engineer Geoffrey Binnie the key engineer). Additional structural analysis was done for Binnie by his friends at Imperial College, Professor Pippard and Letitia Chitty, who "developed a stress analysis technique using relaxation methods and a rubber model to verify the design form."

Prior to the flooding of Lake Dukan, the area was subjected to archaeological research to investigate as many archaeological sites as possible. An archaeological survey in the Ranya Plain documented some 40 archaeological sites with evidence for occupation ranging from the sixth millennium BCE up to the present. Five of these sites were then excavated: Tell Bazmusian, ed-Dem, Kamarian, Qarashina and Tell Shemshara. The excavations at Tell Bazmusian revealed a temple dating to the second millennium BCE. At Tell Shemshara, an early-sixth millennium BCE village was excavated, as well as an early-second millennium BCE palace with a small archive of clay tablets. The inhabitants of some 50 villages in the flooded area, around 1,000–1,200 families, were resettled to the west of the lake. The power station was designed in 1973 by the Russian company Hydroproject and became operational in 1979. Due to lack of maintenance and repairs, the power station has underperformed and is now, after 30 years of service, due for replacement. In 2007, the World Bank began a US$40 million project to repair the Dokan and Darbandikhan Dams. Repairs to the Dokan Dam are expected to cost over $8 million and be complete in late 2012.

Characteristics of the dam

The Dukan Dam is a multi-purpose concrete arch dam abutted by gravity monoliths.

See also

List of dams and reservoirs in Iraq

References

Dams in Iraq
Dams on the Little Zab River
Hydroelectric power stations in Iraq
Arch dams
Sulaymaniyah Governorate
Dams completed in 1959
1959 establishments in Iraq
Energy infrastructure completed in 1979
Iraq–Soviet Union relations
Soviet foreign aid